Dypsis basilonga is a species of flowering plant in the family Arecaceae. It is endemic to Madagascar. It grows in humid, mossy habitat on mountains. It is threatened by overharvesting.

References

basilonga
Endemic flora of Madagascar
Endangered plants
Taxonomy articles created by Polbot
Taxa named by Henri Lucien Jumelle
Taxa named by Joseph Marie Henry Alfred Perrier de la Bâthie
Flora of the Madagascar subhumid forests
Flora of the Madagascar lowland forests